"Always" is a song by American rock band Blink-182, released on November 15, 2004 as the fourth and final single from the group's untitled fifth studio album. The song was the lowest charting single from the album, but the song's music video received extensive play on music video channels. Like much of the album, the song shows the band's 1980s influences, with the multiple-layered, heavily effected guitars and new wave synthesizers.

The song can also be found on the band's 2005 compilation Greatest Hits.

Background
All three of the band members associated the song with the music of the 1980s. Tom DeLonge, in an interview with MTV News, described the song as a "love song."

In another interview with MTV News, DeLonge explained the song and addressed the lyrics of the choruses, jokingly:

Composition
"Always" was written by bassist Mark Hoppus, drummer Travis Barker, and guitarist Tom DeLonge, while sung by DeLonge and Hoppus and produced by Jerry Finn. The song is composed in the key of B major and is set in time signature of common time with a tempo of 158 beats per minute. The vocal range spans from A3 to D7. Referred to as "the '80s song" during production, "Always" features an uptempo backbeat combined with a New Romantic-era keyboard, and pulls from new wave influences. Mike Rampton of Louder Sound described the song as "power-pop perfection". The song's outro features four separate bass guitars being played; Hoppus uses a Fender Bass VI, a Fender Precision Bass "doing two different things," and a Roland Synth Bass. Barker pulled from Missing Persons for inspiration whilst creating the song's percussion.

Journalist Joe Shooman pointed out that the song's central guitar riff is remescient of The Only Ones' "Another Girl, Another Planet" (1979). He called it "the thickest-textured Blink track of all-time," and acknowledged its tribute to 1980s synth-driven pop.

Chart success and live history
"Always" was announced as the fourth and final single from Blink-182 in August 2004. "It's gonna change people's lives and might actually change the world forever," guitarist Tom DeLonge jokingly predicted. It was first serviced to radio in mid-November 2004.

The song was only performed twice in its original release, prior to the band’s "indefinite hiatus." It has nonetheless been performed regularly since the band's return.

Reception
A.D. Amorosi of The Philadelphia Inquirer, in his 2003 review of Blink-182, called the song "contagious." Consequence of Sound, in a 2015 top 10 of the band's best songs, ranked it as number four, calling it "far and away the best track on the album." Stereogum and Kerrang both named "Always" as Blink-182's eighth-best song.

Music video

The music video for "Always" was directed by Joseph Kahn. The group shot it while on tour in Australia in mid-2004, at the same studio space used by the Wiggles. It features Australian pop singer Sophie Monk. The video is displayed as three horizontal panels, in which Monk flirts with DeLonge, Hoppus and Barker. However, the panels sever the onscreen participants in three. Monk appears as a fractured whole, while parts of the band members combine to make one character. The trio's characters attempt to plead with Monk, trying to repair a damaged relationship, which are depicted through fights, arguments, and "the occasional making-up/making-out," which is handled by Barker. In reference to the video, DeLonge said "It's like doing an algebraic formulation on paper when you watch it. It's the same kind of feeling [...] but it's rad." Bassist Mark Hoppus called it the most technically complicated video the band ever had to shoot, as it required choreographed positioning in real time. The video was photographed by Brad Rushing and edited by David Blackburn who won the MVPA Best Editing Award for his work.

The song was a hit on music video channels, where it was among the most-played on Fuse, MTV2 and MuchMusic into January 2005.

Track listing

 The two live tracks were originally broadcast live on The WB's Pepsi Smash concert series.

Charts

Release history

References

Notes

External links
 

Blink-182 songs
2004 singles
2003 songs
Music videos directed by Joseph Kahn
Songs written by Tom DeLonge
Songs written by Travis Barker
Songs written by Mark Hoppus
Geffen Records singles